Baisi Assembly constituency is an assembly constituency in Purnea district in the Indian state of Bihar.

Overview
As per Delimitation of Parliamentary and Assembly constituencies Order, 2008, No 57 Baisi Assembly constituency is composed of the following: Baisi and Dagarua community development blocks.

Baisi Assembly constituency is part of No 10 Kishanganj (Lok Sabha constituency).

Members of Legislative Assembly 

^ denotes by-poll

Election results

2015 
In the 2015 Bihar Assembly Elections, Abdus Subhan of RJD defeated independent Binod Kumar.

2020
In the 2020 Bihar Assembly Elections, Syed Ruknuddin Ahmad of AIMIM defeated BJP Vinod Kumar.

References

External links
 

Assembly constituencies of Bihar
Politics of Purnia district